"Vivat Russia!" International Open DanceSport Tournament is a dancesport tournament held on annual basis (since 2007) in Krasnodar region. Starting from 2007 the tournament is recognized as an international one being held in Adler, from 2009 on the tournament has been held in Sochi. The contest consists of two syllabi: Standard and  Latin. 
Dancers that chose the first syllabus must base their routines on Waltz, Tango, Viennese Waltz, Slow Foxtrot and Quickstep. Dancers that chose the Latina syllabus must base their routines on such dances as Latina, Samba, Cha-Cha-Cha, Rumba, Paso Doble and Jive.
"Vivat Russia!" is a traditional tournament of the World DanceSport Federation (WDSF). Each participant of the tournament receives rating points and takes his or her position in the world ratings based on the rank achieved. International status is the highest status available, thus couples competing at "Vivat Russia!" Tournament may potentially receive maximum possible number of points.

"Vivat Russia!" is also an official rating tournament of the Dance Sport Federation of Russia. Couples that take part in this tournament receive rating points that improve their rating in Russian Federation. This allows the best couples to skip the hardest elimination rounds at the next year Russian Federation Championship based on results of the previous year.

"Vivat Russia!" Tournament is considered a must for couples who wish to improve their dancing class. To improve their class a couple must gain at least two rating points at the tournament. "Glory to Russia" Tournament, Russian Federation championships and contests have the same status. There is no other such tournament.

"Vivat Russia!" IOT is considered the world's second dancesport tournament by number of participants.

Rules 
International tournaments must comply with WDSF Competition Rules. Any other tournaments must comply with DSFR Regulations, including dress design regulations and movements restrictions.
For each round except for the final a half of the participating couples must be recalled to the next round by Adjudicators.
Total of 6 couples must be recalled to the final. In case two couples get equal number of points total of 7 couples may be recalled to the final. In any other disputable cases the decision on number of finalists shall be made by the Chairman of Adjudicators.

Figures 
 Lifts are not permitted in any category.
 In E, D, C classes lines, jumps, Grand Battement, Développé, Attitude, Grand Rond, low stretches are not permitted. Maximum leg elevation for kicks and flicks may not exceed 45 degrees.
 In E and D classes only listed figures must be performed with strict observance of unified technique and timing.
 In Latin American dances only basic hand positions (changed positions 1, 2, 3) are used. Couples may dance for maximum of 4 bars without hand connections (6 bars for Jive).
 For Cha-Cha-Cha in D class Chasse may be replaced with Ronde Chasse, Hip Twist Chasse, Slip Chasse. In C class Crossover Chasse, Ronde Close Chasse, Three Step Turn may be performed. 
 For Cha-Cha-Cha with Guapacha timing in D class Close Basic and Check may be performed. In C class Time Step, Fan, Turkish Towel and Cross Basic may be performed.
 For Jive in D class in Ball Change figure the point may be replaced with a flick. In C class Chasse may be replaced with Single Step, Double Step. 
 For any Latin American dance in C class dancers may perform figures in various positions which are characteristic for the dance and may use various hand positions. For example, for Samba the following figures may be performed in shadow position: Travelling Volta, Circular Volta, Bota Fogos, Corta Jaca, Crusado Locks, Roll. For Cha-Cha-Cha the following figures may be performed: Open Basic, Close Basic, Time step with Guapacha timing, Ronde Chasse, Cuban Break, Split Cuban Break. 
 For Standard routine dances in С class figure elements may be connected, male partner may perform steps of female partner and vice versa. Figures from other Standard dance may be performed.

Dancers' dresses 
 Dresses have to create characteristic shape for each discipline representing special character of Standard and Latin American dances.
 Dresses have to cover the intimate parts of the dancer's body (intimacy area).
 Dresses and make-up have to respect age and level of dancers. 
 Using of religious symbols as decoration or decoration jewelry is not allowed (does not apply to personal jewelry).
 The chairman can ask the competitor to remove an item of jewelry or dress if it presents danger to the dancer or to other competitors.
 It is allowed to dance in dresses for lower categories.
 Any use of material or color or construction or other contrivance that gives the appearance of non-compliance with these dress rules, even though there is no breach of the literal wording of these rules, will be a breach of these rules if so determined by the Chairman of Adjudicators.
 Dancers not dressed in accordance with this Dress Regulation and who receive a warning from the Chairman of Adjudicators has to comply with the regulation or face disqualification.

History of the Tournament 
The idea of the tournament belongs to Pavel Dorokhov, the President of the Dance Sport Federation of Russia, and Vladimir Shturkin, Director of the Dynamo Dance Sport Center and member of the Presidium of Kuban Dance Sport Federation. In 2005 the pilot tournament named "The Pearl of Russia" was held. The name was given to honor the city of Sochi hosting the tournament. Sochi Summer Cinema was chosen the venue for the event.
The competitions held in 2005 shown that the event was of great interest for dancers from Russia and CIS countries. In addition to Russian dancers Ukrainian and Armenian dancers took part in the first tournament. In August 2006 the second dancesport tournament was held in Sochi. Since the competitions were considered a great success, it was decided to establish an emblematic tournament which would be held at the Black Sea coast and attract not only Russian dancing couples but foreign dancers as well.

Organizers of the Tournament 
 DanceSport Federation of Russia
 Krasnodar Regional Non-governmental Organization "Kuban Dance Sport Federation"
 Krasnodar Regional Non-governmental Organization "Dynamo Sport Center"

Emblem of the Tournament 
One of the differences between "Vivat Russia!" and other similar events is its unique emblem displaying a dancing couple, which is renewed on annual basis. All emblem versions share the same style.

Tournament Chronicles

"Vivat Russia!" - 2007 
"Vivat Russia!" First International Open Tournament was held from June 28 until July 1, 2007 at Alexander Karelin Sports Center in Adler. 1217 couples competed in 29 groups. 
As a part of the tournament the Sochi Mayor Cup Contest was officially held. The tournament was supported by the executive committee of the Dance Sport Federation of Russia, Application Committee of Russian Federation, Dynamo Central Council of Russian Federation, Department of the Ministry of Internal Affairs in Krasnodar region, Krasnodar Regional Council of Dynamo.
Among the members of the tournament Organizing Committee were the DSFR Executive Committee, Pavel Dorokhov, the President of DSFR, Vladimir Shturkin, Director of the Dynamo Dance Sport Center in Krasnodar region, Alexei Kravets, world-class dancer, master of sports in dancesport and instructor of Dynamo Dance Sport Center, Oleg Zemtsov, Director of Vodoley Dance Sport Club, Sergei Shvetsov and Liana Zakrzhevskaya, Directors of Argo Dance Sport Club.

"Vivat Russia!" - 2008 
Venue: "Vesna" boarding house and Alexander Karelin Sports Center in Adler. 
The competitions were held from June 26 to June 29, 2008. Sochi Mayor Cup Contest was officially held at the tournament for the second year in a row. In 2008 number of competitors increased to 1554 couples, the origin of participants was also more diverse. 1554 couples competed in 28 groups. The event was characterized by very high class of competing dancers in juvenile age categories (7 to 9 years old and 10 to 11 years old).

"Vivat Russia!" - 2009 
The tournament was held from June 23 to June 28 at "Festivalny" Concert Hall in Sochi. 2257 couples from 64 regions of Russian Federation and 25 other countries competed in 31 groups.
For the first time as a part of the tournament the championship was held between teams of federal districts of Russian Federation. And for the first time in the history of the Dance Sport Federation of Russia, representatives of all 9 federal districts gathered together. "Vivat Russia!" project attracted attention of Kuban governor, too, thus in 2009 the tournament got support of the Department for Comprehensive Development of Kuban Resorts and Tourism.
The tournament was attended by Pavel Dorokhov and Heinz Spaeker, Germany, the WDSF Sports Director, who acted in the capacity of the Chairman of Adjudicators.

"Vivat Russia!" - 2010 
"Vivat Russia!" International Open DanceSport Tournament 2010 was held from June 22 to June 27, 2010, at "Festivalny" Concert Hall in Sochi. 2526 couples from 14 countries and 62 regions of Russian Federation competed in 27 groups.
The Board of Adjudicators from 38 regions noted high class of competing dancers. As a part of the tournament Krasnodar Regional Dance Sport Cup was also held.
In 2010 году "Vivat Russia!" became the world's second dancesport tournament by number of participants.

Participants of the tournament noted that:
...We were charmed by the beauty of the tournament, and even the strong storm on the first day could not spoil the impression.

"Vivat Russia!" - 2011 
Fifth International Open DanceSport Tournament 2011 was held from June 22 to June 26, 2011, at "Festivalny" Concert Hall in Sochi. 2800 couples from 22 countries and 61 regions of Russian Federation competed in 30 groups. The Board of Adjudicators was composed of referees from 17 countries. 
As a part of "Vivat Russia!" IOT 2011 event, the XVI "Exercise" National Award Annual Ceremony was held in order to award those who made the most significant contribution to development of dancesport in 2010.

Tournament trends 

Number of participating couples by year:

Number of participants is constantly growing. According to estimates of the organizers over 3500 couples will take part in the tournament in 2012.

References

External links 

 "Vivat Russia!" IOT official web site
 :ru:Dance Sport Federation of Russia
 WDSF official web site
 Dancesport and ballroom dancing in Russia and abroad
 Dynamo Sports Club

Dancesport
Dance competition television shows
Festivals in Russia
Recurring events established in 2007
Culture of Krasnodar Krai